Stéphane Traineau (born 16 September 1966) is a French judoka who competed at four Olympic Games.

Achievements

References

External links

 
 
 
 Videos of Stéphane Traineau (judovision.org)

1966 births
Living people
French male judoka
Judoka at the 1988 Summer Olympics
Judoka at the 1992 Summer Olympics
Judoka at the 1996 Summer Olympics
Judoka at the 2000 Summer Olympics
Olympic judoka of France
Olympic bronze medalists for France
Olympic medalists in judo
World judo champions
Medalists at the 2000 Summer Olympics
Medalists at the 1996 Summer Olympics
Mediterranean Games gold medalists for France
Mediterranean Games bronze medalists for France
Mediterranean Games medalists in judo
Competitors at the 1993 Mediterranean Games
Competitors at the 1997 Mediterranean Games